The Premio del Giubileo is a Group 3 flat horse race in Italy open to thoroughbreds aged three years or older. It is run over a distance of 1,800 metres (1⅛ miles) at Milan in late June or early July.

History
The event was formerly run as a limited handicap. It used to be contested over 1,600 metres. It became a Listed conditions race in 2007.

The Premio del Giubileo was extended to 1,800 metres in 2010. It was promoted to Group 3 level in 2013.

Records

Winners since 1987

See also
 List of Italian flat horse races

References

 Racing Post / www.labronica.it:
 1997, 1998, 1999, 2000, 2001, 2002, 2003, 2004, 2005, 2006

Open mile category horse races
Sport in Milan
Horse races in Italy